This list of wound decorations is an index of articles that describe notable awards given for wounds; usually, though not exclusively, to military personnel during wartime.

See also

 Lists of awards
 List of military decorations
 Wound stripe

References

 
Wounds